Eudesmia major is a moth of the subfamily Arctiinae. It is found in Panama.

References

 Natural History Museum Lepidoptera generic names catalog

Eudesmia
Moths described in 1912